Gradišče is a settlement above Podsreda in the Municipality of Kozje in eastern Slovenia. The area is part of the historical Lower Styria region. The municipality is now included in the Savinja Statistical Region.

The local church, built on a hill south of the settlement known as Old Holy Mount, is dedicated to Mary of the Seven Sorrows and belongs to the Parish of Podsreda. It dates to the first half of the 14th century. A series of thirteen chapels representing Calvary and the Stations of the Cross was built along the path leading up the hill to the church in 1834.

References

External links
Gradišče on Geopedia

Populated places in the Municipality of Kozje